David Proctor may refer to:

 David Proctor (footballer, born 1984), Scottish football player and coach
 David Proctor (footballer, born 1929), Northern Irish footballer
 David Proctor (admiral), officer in the Royal New Zealand Navy
 R. David Proctor (born 1960), United States judge

See also 
 Proctor (surname)